WDR 1 was a German public radio station owned and operated by the Westdeutscher Rundfunk (WDR).

History 

The station was originally the information program of the WDR and combined entertainment and pop music on the one hand with public service information and educational mission on the other. Instead of a fully formatted program, WDR 1 offered many special interest programs, a high proportion of words and a targeted regional focus.

WDR 1 officially went on air on January 1, 1956, after the regional stations WDR and Norddeutscher Rundfunk (NDR) had been formed from the NWDR. Until the NDR radio programs were reorganized in 1981, WDR 1 and NDR 1 broadcast a joint program that was only temporarily split into regional programs.

References

Westdeutscher Rundfunk
Defunct radio stations in Germany
Radio stations established in 1956
Radio stations disestablished in 1995
1956 establishments in West Germany
1995 disestablishments in Germany
Mass media in Cologne